Nautilia lithotrophica is a thermophilic sulfur-reducing epsilon-proteobacterium isolated from a deep-sea hydrothermal vent. It is strictly anaerobic, with type strain 525T (= DSM 13520T).

References

Further reading

Satyanarayana, T., and B. N. Johri. Microbial diversity: current perspectives and potential applications. IK International Pvt Ltd, 2005.
Voordeckers, James Walter. Physiology and molecular ecology of chemolithoautotrophic nitrate reducing bacteria at deep sea hydrothermal vents. ProQuest, 2007.
Satyanarayana, Tulasi, Jennifer Littlechild, and Yutaka Kawarabayasi. "Thermophilic Microbes in Environmental and Industrial Biotechnology."

External links

LPSN
WORMS
Type strain of Nautilia lithotrophica at BacDive -  the Bacterial Diversity Metadatabase

Campylobacterota
Bacteria described in 2002